The following is a list of the governors of the State of New Mexico (Spanish: gobernadores de Nuevo México) and Territory of New Mexico.

Twenty-eight individuals have held the office of governor of New Mexico since the state's admission to the Union in 1912, two of whom—Edwin L. Mechem and Bruce King—served three non-consecutive terms. King holds the record as New Mexico's longest-serving governor, with 12 years of service. William C. McDonald, the first governor, took office on January 6, 1912. The current officeholder is Michelle Lujan Grisham, who took office on January 1, 2019, as the first elected female Democratic governor of the state. Governors are limited to two consecutive terms, but a former governor is eligible for re-election after an intervening governor's term expires.

Governors

Governors under U.S. military rule

In 1846 the U.S. Army under Stephen W. Kearny invaded and occupied New Mexico. Military governors at times were assisted by civilian governors.

Military governors were:

Civilian governors were:

Governors of the Territory of New Mexico
In 1850 New Mexico was organized as a Territory.

Governors of the State of New Mexico

Notes

References

External links

State of New Mexico website
New Mexico History Museum website

 
 
Governors of New Mexico, List of
Lists of state governors of the United States
Lists of territorial governors of the United States